The Tutuí River is a river of Pará state in north-central Brazil.

See also
List of rivers of Pará

References
Brazilian Ministry of Transport

Rivers of Pará